Saltcoats North railway station was a railway station serving the town of Saltcoats, North Ayrshire, Scotland as part of the Lanarkshire and Ayrshire Railway.

History 

The station opened on 3 September 1888 and was simply known as Saltcoats. It closed between 1 January 1917 and 1 February 1919 due to wartime economy, and upon the grouping of the L&AR into the London, Midland and Scottish Railway in 1923, the station was renamed Saltcoats North on 2 June 1924. The station closed to passengers on 4 July 1932, however it was reopened for a time within two years when a special return fare price was introduced. The line saw use for trains going to Ardrossan Montgomerie Pier and the Ardrossan Shell Mex plant until 1968.

Station description 

The station consisted of two side platforms connected by a footbridge and with a small building on each side. By 1956 the footbridge and the building on the eastboard platform had been removed, however the westbound building remained intact albeit derelict. By the late 1960s only the overgrown platforms remained.

A goods yard and signal box stood on the Ardrossan side of the station, accessed off  Caledonia Road, with a four sidings, loading dock, goods shed, crane and weighing machine.

Redevelopment 

Since demolition, the site of Saltcoats North has been redeveloped into a housing estate. Most of the trackbed between the station and Stevenston Moorpark station has been filled in and converted into a pathway signposted as 'Old Caley Line'. Several road bridges that crossed the line here are still in existence, though are now partially buried in the ground. Aside from the road bridge that was directly adjacent to the station, there is no trace left of the station itself.

References

Notes

Sources 
 
 
 

Disused railway stations in North Ayrshire
Railway stations in Great Britain opened in 1888
Railway stations in Great Britain closed in 1917
Railway stations in Great Britain opened in 1919
Railway stations in Great Britain closed in 1932
Former Caledonian Railway stations
Ardrossan−Saltcoats−Stevenston